Christian Cyclopedia (originally Lutheran Cyclopedia) is a one-volume compendium of theological data, ranging from ancient figures to contemporary events. It is published by Concordia Publishing House as an update to the Concordia Cyclopedia of 1927, authored by Ludwig Fuerbringer. The 1927 version was an update to The Lutheran Cyclopedia (New York:  Charles Scribner%27s Sons, 1898), edited by Henry Eyster Jacobs and Charles A. W. Haas, of the General Council and its Lutheran Theological Seminary at Philadelphia. Because the shift from the 1898 to 1927 versions occurred between different denominations of Lutherans, the point of view for certain articles shifted accordingly. However, other articles have barely changed at all between even the 1898 and 2000 Cyclopedias.

See also
 List of online encyclopedias#Religion and theology

External links
Christian Cyclopedia Online internet version, 2000
Concordia Cyclopedia by L. Fuerbringer, 1927
Concordia Cyclopedia by L. Fuerbringer, 1927 (better quality scan)
1898 Lutheran Cyclopedia (Google Books)

American online encyclopedias
Christian encyclopedias
History of Lutheranism